Frenchs Creek is a stream in Onslow County, North Carolina, in the United States.

The name Frenchs Creek most likely honors Alexander Nicola, a French pioneer who settled there.

Variant names
According to the Geographic Names Information System, it has also been known historically as:
Farnell Bay
French Creek
Frenches Creek
Frenchmans Creek

Course
Frenchs Creek rises within Camp LeJeune in Onslow County and then flows northwest to join the New River also within Camp LeJeune.

Watershed
Frenchs Creek drains  of area, receives about 55.6 in/year of precipitation, and has a wetness index of 547.71 and is about 11% forested.

See also
List of rivers of North Carolina

References

Rivers of Onslow County, North Carolina
Rivers of North Carolina
Tributaries of the White Oak River